Serpent Model Racing Cars B.V. (known commonly as Serpent, or alternatively Serpent Motorsport, Serpent MRC or Team Serpent) was a company from Heemstede, North Holland in the Netherlands specializing in competition grade radio controlled cars which has won numerous IFMAR and EFRA titles, plus several national title; they are currently Chinese owned and all products are made in China as of printing.

History
The company was officially founded in 1980 as a brand name to Berton BV, named after a combination its founders, Pieter Bervoets and Ron Ton who were both radio controlled car racers. The pair built their first RC car in 1972, using a Kyosho Dash 1 chassis modified by themselves, then in 1977, the duo started to develop their first car under the Serpent name in 1977 and in 1979, both Bervoets and Ton had won separate EFRA 1:8 titles with their Mk. III Pro.

One of its highlights of its competition career is the total domination during the IFMAR World Championship for 1:10 Scale 235mm IC On-Road cars that took place in Apeldoorn, in the Netherlands; when the Impacts, its competition car for the category at the time, dominated the top 10 positions in both the Class 1 (sportscars) and Class 2 (touring cars).

The cars are nowadays developed using 3D CAD software such as Pro/Engineer and SolidWorks and are tested at the nearby race track in Heemstede.
Other than competing in national and international championships, Serpent also has its own one-make series Serpent Nitro Tours and Serpent Series, also has its own drivers' development program (Serpent Driver Development).

Ton sold off his shares to Bervoets in 1997 who in turn sold the company off to Ronald Baar and the works' championship winning driver and designer, Michael Salven in 2005 to allow him to concentrate on his other project that he had also been running for years before, Virtual RC Racing, specializing in RC car racing simulation for home computers.

Following its takeover, there had been a few changes to the company, although the hissing snake symbol has never been changed since the beginning, the company's colour scheme has changed from magenta to the national Dutch colour scheme of orange and the logo has also been changed before the takeover. Another change to the company was, the popular and long running RC community orientated website myTSN was disbanded in favour of a more dedicated company site

In 2008 the Dutch company went into bankruptcy. The recently started Off-Road projects were paused and the brand and the stock was sold to new company VectorRC in Holland. Serpent Ltd in Hong Kong is now in charge for the production and Distribution in Asia, Serpent Europe for Europe and Serpent America for the American region.  Michael Salven, Ronald de Baar are owners of the Serpent brand and run a company (VectorRC BV)  that takes care of the development and the marketing world-wide.

As of 2009, Serpent have won a total of seven world (IFMAR) and thirty three European titles (EFRA) together with five Japanese (JMRCA) and eight U.S. (ROAR) national titles as well as three Winternats.

In 2011, VectorRC  teamed up with 2 new partners in China and created Serpent Ltd Hong Kong. By moving to China, Serpent has been able to develop the car line-up massively to over 30 different models, while maintaining the very high quality and performance standards.

Product lines

 1:8
 811 Cobra Be
 Off-road
 

 
 EP
 2011
 1:10
 411 
 On-road
 

 
 EP
2011

References

http://www.retromodelisme.com/liste_manuel.html?d=30&l=&co=&m=6&c=&e=&mo=
http://www.rcmag.com/reviews/retro/voitures/piste/lesvoitures/serpent/serpent.htm
https://web.archive.org/web/20110719113818/http://www.wh-racing.de/01973c9224134640c/automodelleverbrenner/serpent.html
https://web.archive.org/web/20060312182602/http://www.rc-junkies.nl/images/library/SpotlightopSerpent.pdf
https://web.archive.org/web/20110724030306/http://www.rcbazar.net/modules.php?name=News&file=article&sid=469
http://www.rctech.net/forum/showthread.php?p=4035794

External links
Official site

Radio-controlled car manufacturers
Companies based in North Holland
Toy companies established in 1980
Model manufacturers of the Netherlands